Alexander Lawrie Robson (February 7, 1898 – January 27, 1974) was a Scottish-Canadian professional golfer.

Robson was born in Edinburgh, Scotland. Having moved to Canada, he had a successful tournament career, highlighted by winning the Canadian PGA Championship in 1932, and finishing as runner-up in the Canadian Open in 1933. He also won the Millar Trophy, originally awarded for the Ontario PGA Match Play championship and later the Canadian PGA Match Play, on six occasions.

In 1934, as recognition for his consistently good play, Robson was invited to compete in the inaugural Masters Tournament but he was unable to play. In 2008 he was inducted into the Ontario Golf Hall of Fame.

Robson served as the head professional at several golf clubs in Ontario, most notably at Islington Golf Club in Etobicoke for many years until 1939, when he moved to Kawartha Golf & Country Club in Peterborough where he remained for 25 years.

Professional wins
 1931 Millar Trophy
 1932 Canadian PGA Championship, Millar Trophy
 1934 Millar Trophy
 1935 Ontario Open, Millar Trophy
 1936 Millar Trophy
 1939 Millar Trophy

References

Canadian male golfers
British emigrants to Canada
Scottish male golfers
Golfing people from Ontario
Golfers from Edinburgh
Sportspeople from Peterborough, Ontario
1898 births
1974 deaths